Miguel Ángel González Dávila, also known as Excelente compañero (born 15 November 1970), is a Mexican professional boxer who held the world lightweight title.

Amateur career
González grew up in a middle-class family among the suburbs of Mexico City, Mexico. At the age of 15, he began his amateur boxing career under the tutelage of legendary Mexican trainer, Pancho Rosales.

En route to an amateur record of 63–3, Gonzalez defeated future World Boxing Council (WBC) junior lightweight titleholder Gabriel Ruelas in 1988 to earn a spot on Mexico's Olympic team as a featherweight. He lost his first match to local Lee Jae-Hyuk.

Professional career
González turned pro at age 18 on 21 January 1989, and scored a fifth-round technical knockout over Isidro Pacheco in Ciudad Victoria, Mexico.

After fighting for nearly two years in Mexico, González moved to Japan in the late 1980s and lived there through most of 1991. While residing there, he floored all five of his opponents and was a neighbor of future world champions Yuri Arbachakov and Orzubek Nazarov (also lightweight title holder). It was there that González got his nickname "Santa Tokyo".

On 24 August 1992, González received his first world title shot when he faced Colombian puncher Wilfrido Rocha for the World Boxing Council lightweight title in Mexico City. In a sensational fight, González had his hands full with Rocha, who put the Mexican native on the canvas in the second round. González also had his nose bloodied by his game opponent, but managed to roar back in rounds four and five. González eventually cut Rocha and forced the referee to halt matters in the ninth.

Made 10 title defenses with success (Dec. 1992 – June '95), he was dominant at the start KOing contenders Leavander Johnson and Jean-Baptiste Mendy but lost his form and struggled later.
Gonzalez won a hard-fought, and somewhat controversial, majority decision over Lamar Murphy on 19 August 1995, in Las Vegas.

Higher weight classes
After the Murphy fight, González decided to vacate his title. Finding it more and more difficult to maintain the lightweight limit, González moved up one weight class with the guarantee of becoming the WBC No. 1 140-pound contender and a receiving a shot at the winner of the Julio César Chávez-Oscar De La Hoya fight.

In 1996, González, campaigning at 143 and 144 pounds, notched three non-title victories, including a fifth-round TKO over Juan Soberanes on 18 May 1996, in Las Vegas.

Exactly eight months later on 18 January 1997, González faced WBC super lightweight champion Oscar De La Hoya. De La Hoya was the naturally bigger man coming into the bout. Although González lost a 12-round unanimous decision, he counter-attacked well by utilizing his right hand (which in the end caused a bad swelling on De La Hoya's left cheek) to keep the champion away. He also did, however, get two points deducted for repeated fouls which included low blows, rabbit punches, and hitting on the break.

Gonzalez rebounded quickly from the loss to de la Hoya by stopping Bert Granciosa in the third round as part of Evander Holyfield vs. Mike Tyson II undercard on 28 June 1997.

As the then-WBC No. 2 super lightweight contender, and with the belt vacant, González received his opportunity to fight for another belt and take on his own boyhood idol, Chávez. Originally scheduled for 25 October 1997, the showdown was postponed when Chávez suffered an injury during training camp. More than five months later on 7 March 1998, the war between Mexican heroes finally took place live on pay per view from Mexico City.

As the main event in both fighters' homeland, the two former champions entered as top-ranked contenders for the WBC super lightweight belt and battled for 12 grueling rounds. González came out strong in most of the rounds and dominated the first minute or two before Chávez dug down deep to dominate the remainder of the stanzas. When the scorecards were tallied, one judge had it 116–114 for González, another saw it 115–114 for Chávez, while the final judge scored it even at 115–115.

After fighting to a draw against Chávez, González returned four months later and tallied a fifth-round TKO over Alexis Pérez on 11 July 1998, in San Antonio, Texas. Gonzalez landed a furious barrage in the fifth and forced the stoppage.

Stepping into the ring following a 14-month layoff due to repeated injury, Gonzalez took on Interim WBC Super Lightweight Champion, Kostya Tszyu, for the vacant title on Showtime 21 August 1999, in Miami.

After suffering an incidental head butt in the first round that opened a cut over his left eye, Gonzalez responded in kind in the second and attempted to hit Tszyu with low blows. His dirty tactics did not work as Tszyu thoroughly dominated his opponent. After watching his fighter withstand brutal combinations from Tszyu for much of the bout, González' trainer, Abel Sanchez, asked Referee Frank Santore to stop the bout with 48 seconds remaining in the 10th round.

After more than 15 months outside of the ring, González returned on 2 December 2000, in Las Vegas, and earned an opening-round TKO over Alex Lubo.

Three months later in his sole 2001 outing, González dropped a stunning 10-round split decision to lightly regarded Manuel Gomez in Las Vegas. Gomez, who had not fought since November 1998, outworked the former world champion en route to winning by the scores 97–92 and 95–94 for Gomez and 95 apiece.

Again González spent more than one year outside the ring before fighting 14 months later on 3 May 2002, in Ensenada, Mexico, against Roberto Urias. Three rounds into the contest, Gonzalez sent Urias to the canvas.

In his next outing 16 months later, Gonzalez floored Christian Solano three times en route to tallying a fifth-round TKO on 6 September 2003, in Mexico City. The first knockdown occurred in round two with a right hook to the head. Gonzalez then sent Solano to the canvas again in the third with another right hook, before ending matters with a right hook to the body in the fifth.

González closed out his 15th year as a pro with an opening-round TKO over Gregorio Balcazar on 18 October 2003, and a fourth-round KO against Norberto Sandoval on 28 November 2003.

González registered a 10-round unanimous decision over Ernesto Carmona on 22 May 2004, in one of the bloodiest bouts of the year.

In his last outing, González had earned the right to face undisputed welterweight champion Cory Spinks at Mandalay Bay in Las Vegas on 4 September. González took the fight to the elusive Spinks from the opening bell, throwing a lot of leather, but the slick southpaw champion proved too hard to find. Gonzalez lost by decision.

The following year, he challenged (then) WBA welterweight champion, Luis Collazo. He lost by TKO in the 8th round. Then, in 2006, he fought twice against low-ranked opponents in Mexico, winning both. He is still considered active following these last two fights, and it is not clear when González is planning to announce his retirement.

Miguel Ángel González is recognized as one of the best lightweight of the early 1990s. Due to his impressive unbeaten streak, he was once held in the same regard as Julio César Chávez and Ricardo Lopez (arguably the best and most popular Mexican boxers during the same period), but his star began to fade in the latter half of the decade as he failed to recapture his dominant form once he moved up to junior welterweight. Losses to De La Hoya and Tszyu, failure to defeat the aging Chavez, repeated injury, and lack of championship titles diminished his stature as an elite boxer. His decline also coincided with the rise of fresh Mexican stars, most notably Marco Antonio Barrera and Erik Morales.

Professional boxing record

Pay-per-view bouts

See also
List of WBC world champions
List of Mexican boxing world champions

References

External links

 

1970 births
Boxers from Mexico City
Living people
Olympic boxers of Mexico
Boxers at the 1988 Summer Olympics
Mexican male boxers
Welterweight boxers